F is the service designation for trains on the ring line of Copenhagen's S-train network. It runs from  05:00 to 01:00 from Ny Ellebjerg to Hellerup. Trains run every 5 minutes between about 7:00 and 19:00, Monday through Friday, and every 10 minutes on weekends, early mornings and late evenings/nights. On Friday and Saturday nights there is also a 30 minutes service throughout the night. In 2024-26 this line is planned to become a pilot project for driverless operation of the S-train system.

History

See Ringbanen for a fuller history.

Fx, M, F+

The ring line also has a history of supplementary services with other designations than F. At some times the variant service letters have been used to indicate which trains continued from Hellerup to Klampenborg. In other periods it has simply been because then-prevalent principles mandated that a single service letter such as F could not be used for more than exactly 3 trains an hour, so in parts of the day when more trains ran, extra services had to be invented.

References

S-train (Copenhagen)